The geology of the Canary Islands is dominated by volcanic rock. The Canary Islands and some seamounts to the north-east form the Canary Volcanic Province whose volcanic history started about 70 million years ago. The Canary Islands region is still volcanically active. The most recent volcanic eruption on land occurred in 2021 and the most recent underwater eruption was in 2011-12.

The islands are located on the African tectonic plate. The Canary Islands are an example of intraplate volcanism because they are located far (more than ) from the edges of the African Plate.

From east to west, the main islands are Lanzarote, Fuerteventura, Gran Canaria, Tenerife, La Gomera, La Palma, and El Hierro. There are also several minor islands and islets.

Lanzarote and Fuerteventura are parts of a single volcanic ridge called the Canary Ridge. These two present-day islands were a single island in the past.
  
Volcanic activity has occurred during the last 11,700 years on all of the main islands except  La Gomera.

Growth stages

Volcanic oceanic islands, such as the Canary Islands, form in deep parts of the oceans. This type of island forms by a sequence of development stages: 
(1) submarine (seamount) stage
(2) shield-building stage
(3) declining stage (La Palma and El Hierro)
(4) erosion stage (La Gomera)
(5) rejuvenation/post-erosional stage (Fuerteventura, Lanzarote, Gran Canaria and Tenerife).

The Canary Islands differ from some other volcanic oceanic islands, such as the Hawaiian Islands, in several ways – for example, the Canary Islands have stratovolcanoes, compression structures and a lack of subsidence.

The seven main Canary Islands originated as separate submarine seamount volcanoes on the floor of the Atlantic Ocean. Each seamount, built up by the eruption of many lava flows, eventually became an island. Subaerial volcanic eruptions continued on each island. Fissure eruptions dominated on Lanzarote and Fuerteventura, resulting in relatively subdued topography with heights below . The other islands are much more rugged and mountainous.

Age

The age of the oldest subaerially-erupted lavas on each island decreases from east to west along the island chain: Lanzarote-Fuerteventura (20.2 Ma), Gran Canaria (14.6 Ma), Tenerife (11.9 Ma), La Gomera (9.4 Ma), La Palma (1.7 Ma) and El Hierro (1.1 Ma).

Rock types

Volcanic rock types found on the Canary Islands are typical of oceanic islands. The volcanic rocks include alkali basalts, basanites, phonolites, trachytes, nephelinites, trachyandesites, tephrites and rhyolites.   

Outcrops of plutonic rocks (for example, syenites, gabbros and  pyroxenites)  occur on Fuerteventura, La Gomera and La Palma.

Volcanic landforms

Examples of the following types of volcanic landforms occur in the Canary Islands: shield volcano, stratovolcano, collapse caldera, erosion caldera, cinder cone, coulee, scoria cone, tuff cone, tuff ring, maar, lava flow, lava flow field, dyke, volcanic plug.

Origins of volcanism

Several hypotheses have been proposed to explain the volcanism of the Canary Islands. Two hypotheses have received the most attention from geologists:

The volcanism is related to crustal fractures extending from the Atlas Mountains of Morocco.
The volcanism is caused by the African Plate moving slowly over a hotspot in the Earth's mantle.

Currently, a hotspot is the explanation accepted by most geologists who study the Canary Islands.

See also
Canary hotspot
Geology of Cape Verde
Geology of Madeira
Geology of Morocco
Savage Islands

Further reading
 Juan Carlos Carracedo, Simon Day: Canary Islands. Classic Geology of Europe 4. Harpenden 2002.

Notes

References

Geology of Spain
Volcanoes of the Canary Islands